1939 in philosophy

Events

Publications 
 G. E. Moore, Proof of an External World (1939)
 Norbert Elias, The Civilizing Process (1939)

Births 
 January 29 - Germaine Greer 
 March 1 - Tzvetan Todorov (died 2017)
 Clément Rosset (unspecified)

Deaths 
 February 4 - Edward Sapir (born 1884)
 September 23 - Sigmund Freud (born 1856)

References 

Philosophy
20th-century philosophy
Philosophy by year